Mark Vancuren (born March 13, 1964) is an American politician who has served in the Oklahoma House of Representatives from the 74th district since 2018. He is Cherokee.

References

1964 births
21st-century Native American politicians
Living people
Cherokee Nation state legislators in Oklahoma
Republican Party members of the Oklahoma House of Representatives
21st-century American politicians